Westlawn may refer to:

 Westlawn (Fayetteville, North Carolina), listed on the NRHP in North Carolina
 Westlawn (Wallingford, Pennsylvania), listed on the NRHP in Pennsylvania